The Liguilla of the Apertura 2012 season was a final knockout tournament involving the top seven teams of the Ascenso MX league. The winner qualified to the playoff match against the Clausura 2013 winner. If the winner of both tournaments was the same team, the team would have been promoted to the 2013–14 Liga MX season without playing the Promotional Final.

Teams
The first team in the general table qualified for the semifinals. The six next best teams in the general table qualified to the quarterfinals.

Bracket
The six best teams after the first place played two games against each other on a home-and-away basis. The winner of each match up was determined by aggregate score. If the teams were tied, the Away goals rule applied.

The teams were seeded one to seven in quarterfinals, and were re-seeded one to four in semifinals depending on their position in the general table. The higher seeded teams played on their home field during the second leg.

 If the two teams were tied after both legs, the away goals rule applied. If both teams still tied, higher seeded team advanced.
 Teams were re-seeded every round.
 The winner qualified to the playoff match vs the Clausura 2013 winner. However, if the winner was the same in both tournaments, they would have been the team promoted to the 2012–13 Mexican Primera División season without playing the Promotional Final

Quarterfinals

First leg

Second leg

All game schedules are expressed in CST time, except where indicated.
Official schedules of Ascenso MX playoffs Quarter-finals

Semifinals

First leg

Second leg

Round tied 3-3. Dorados advance to Final by the away goal rule

All game schedules are in CST time, except where indicated.

Final

First leg

Second leg

Top goalscorers - Liguilla (Playoffs)
Last Updated on December 2, 2012.
Players sorted first by goals scored, then by goal frequency (Minutes played/Goals scored).

Source: Ascenso MX - Apertura 2012 Liguilla goalscorers official page

References

External links
Liga MX and Ascenso MX Official Website

Ascenso MX